Ivindomyrus opdenboschi is a species of elephantfish in the family Mormyridae. It is only found in the Ivindo River in Gabon.

References 

Weakly electric fish
Mormyridae
Fish of Africa
Endemic fauna of Gabon
Fish described in 1975